The Kerry Babies case was a 1984 investigation by the Garda Síochána in County Kerry, Ireland, into the killing of one newborn baby and the alleged killing of another. The mother who concealed the second baby, Joanne Hayes, was arrested and charged with the murder of the first baby, of which she was erroneously thought to be the mother. The Gardaí were forced to drop the charges four years later and a tribunal of inquiry (the "Kerry Babies Tribunal") was launched. Its report was critical of the Garda conduct of the investigations, and it also concluded that Hayes had precipitated the death of her baby. Hayes has disputed this finding, and no charges were pressed. The parents and killer of the first baby have never been identified. In 2020, the Irish State formally apologised after 36 years to Joanne Hayes for wrongly accusing her of the murder and for the "appalling hurt and distress caused."

Events
On 14 April 1984, a newborn baby boy was found dead of 28 stab wounds on White Strand beach at Caherciveen, County Kerry. A woman, Joanne Hayes from Abbeydorney, approximately 80 kilometres away, who was known to have been pregnant, was arrested. She and her family confessed to the murder of the baby but later withdrew their confessions and admitted instead that Hayes's baby had been born on the family farm, had died shortly after birth, and had been wrapped in a plastic bag and buried on the farm in secret. Tests showed that the baby whose body was found on the farm had the same blood type, O, as Hayes and its (married) father, Jeremiah Locke. However, the baby on the beach had blood group A. The Gardaí nevertheless insisted that Hayes had become pregnant simultaneously by two different men (through heteropaternal superfecundation) and had given birth to both children, killing the one found on the beach. Another theory put forward was that the baby's blood type had changed due to decomposition.

Hayes was charged with murder, but the charge was thrown out by a judge, and the Kerry Babies Tribunal, headed by Mr Justice Kevin Lynch, was set up to investigate the behaviour of the Gardaí in the case. Judge Lynch found that Joanne Hayes killed the baby on the farm by choking it to stop it crying, in spite of state pathologist Dr John Harbison's inability to determine the cause of death. Judge Lynch rejected claims by the Hayes family that they had been assaulted by Gardaí and that the confessions were obtained through coercion. Joanne Hayes had claimed that Gardaí slapped, threatened, and coerced her into making a false confession, and other family members had alleged that Gardaí used harassment and physical intimidation to get false confessions. Gene Kerrigan commented in 2006, "In the opinion of some, the report never convincingly explained how people who were entirely innocent of any involvement whatever in stabbing a baby should make very detailed confessions that fitted into the facts of the baby found on the beach." The case was also noteworthy for having a psychiatrist admit under oath that the definition of sociopath he had used to describe Joanne Hayes in his testimony would apply to "about half the population of the country".

Repercussions
The case raised serious questions about the culture of the Garda Síochána, and the treatment of unmarried mothers in Irish society. Journalist Nell McCafferty's book about the case was titled A Woman to Blame. Joanne Hayes co-wrote a book with John Barrett about the episode called My Story. Four Gardaí on the case took legal action against the authors and publishers of the book, as well as shops that sold it. They received out-of-court settlements totalling over €127,000.

In the aftermath of the case the murder squad was disbanded, and the four Gardaí assigned to desk duties, in what was seen as a demotion. In 2004, Joanne Hayes offered to undergo a DNA test to establish that she was not the mother of the baby on the beach. However, one of the officers on the case, Gerry O'Carroll, also sought such a test, saying that he believed the tests will prove the superfecundation theory correct.

The parents or killer of the baby on the beach, later named "Baby John", have never been identified. The gravesite has been repeatedly vandalised, but no suspect has ever been identified for this either.

Case Review 
A Garda review of the DNA evidence, announced on 16 January 2018, confirmed that Joanne Hayes was not the mother of the infant found at White Strand. Irish national media reported that Acting Garda Commissioner Dónall Ó Cualáin offered a full verbal and written apology to Joanne Hayes. This was followed by an apology from the Minister for Justice, Charlie Flanagan and the Taoiseach, Leo Varadkar.

A new investigation into the circumstances of Baby John's death was also launched. In September 2018 it was reported that Gardaí were following up on aspects of the original investigation and engaged in house-to-house inquiries on Valentia Island (the island opposite the beach on which Baby John was discovered), as "part of the general investigation".

In 2020 the State apologised to Joanne Hayes and the Hayes family for their treatment at the hands of the Gardaí and for the false accusations that were levelled at them. Substantial compensation was paid by the state after the family launched proceedings to establish that the findings of wrongdoings by them in the tribunal were unfounded and incorrect. No criminal proceedings have yet been brought against any of the Gardaí involved.

On the morning of 14 September 2021, the remains of Baby John were exhumed by Gardaí at Holy Cross Cemetery, Caherciveen, County Kerry. The baby's remains were taken to the morgue at University Hospital Kerry in Tralee, for examination as part of the ongoing investigation.

In popular culture 
In 2016 the Kerry Babies case was the subject of a film titled Out of Innocence starring Fiona Shaw and Alun Armstrong and distributed by Mbur Indie Film Distribution.
A 2019 scholarly article suggests that unfamiliarity with the poorly-documented "killeen" (or "Cillín") custom (the burial of stillborn babies in unconsecrated ground, which was once prevalent in Kerry) may have been a factor in the case.

See also

List of unsolved deaths
Carlisle buried baby case – A similar baby burial case in Ohio, involving a teenage mother.

References

Citations

Sources

External links
 Kerry Babies news reports from RTÉ Archives

1984 in Ireland
April 1984 events in Europe
History of the Republic of Ireland
Infanticide
Public inquiries in Ireland
Unidentified murder victims
Unsolved deaths
Unsolved murders in Ireland